Eoghan Ruadh, Dungannon GAA is a Gaelic Athletic Association club located in Dungannon, County Tyrone, Northern Ireland. The club is solely concerned with the game of hurling.

History

The Eoghan Ruadh club was founded in Dungannon in 1944. Since then, the club has won several titles in the Tyrone Senior Hurling Championship, and lies second only to Eire Óg Carrickmore on the all-time roll of honour with 24 titles. For most of that time the club had no permanent base and played their matches at O'Neill Park, the home of Dungannon Clarke's GFC, and other neighbouring grounds. In 2015, the club opened their own complex at Donaghmore Road. Further improvements to the club's facilities were undertaken in subsequent years.

Honours
 Tyrone Senior Hurling Championship (24): 1948, 1951, 1952, 1955, 1956, 1957, 1966, 1969, 1975, 1978, 1990, 1992, 1993, 1996, 1997, 1999, 2000, 2001, 2005, 2009, 2012, 2013, 2018, 2019

Notable players

 Damian Casey

References

External links
Eoghan Ruadh GAA site

Gaelic games clubs in County Tyrone
Hurling clubs in County Tyrone